Sean Welsh (born 15 March 1990) is a Scottish footballer, who plays as a midfielder for Inverness Caledonian Thistle in the Scottish Championship. He has previously played for Hibernian, Stenhousemuir, Stirling Albion, Partick Thistle and Falkirk.

Career

Hibernian
A lifelong Hibs fan, Welsh was captain of the Hibs under-19 squad who won a league and cup double in 2008–09. He was awarded under 19 League Player of the Season. A series of injuries, including a double leg break, limited his first team chances Welsh was sent on loan spells at Stenhousemuir and Stirling Albion. In May 2011, Welsh agreed a new one-year contract with Hibs.

In July 2011, Welsh was punched during a training session by teammate Martin Scott, which resulted in Welsh needing four operations to repair a fractured cheekbone. During one operation he suffered an infection that threatened his eyesight, but he recovered. Once recovered Welsh was an unused substitute on eight occasions and joined Partick Thistle on loan to play in more matches. After returning from his loan to Thistle, Welsh was released at the end of his contract in May 2012.

Stenhousemuir (loan)
Welsh joined Scottish Second Division club Stenhousemuir on a month's loan in January 2010 along with fellow youngster Lee Currie. He made his debut as a 61st-minute substitute against Dunfermline in the Scottish Cup, with his league debut coming on 16 January 2010 playing from the start against Arbroath. In all he made 3 appearances for the club.

Stirling (loan)
In February 2011 Welsh Scottish First Division club Stirling Albion on loan, going on to make his debut on 19 February as a substitute in their 1–0 defeat to Dundee. He scored his first goal for the club on 5 March 2011 scoring the opening goal in a 4–3 defeat to Cowdenbeath. In all he made 17 appearances scoring once. In November Stirling tried to bring Welsh back for a second loan spell however this was rejected by Hibs.

Partick Thistle
After impressing in training on 7 February 2012 Welsh joined Scottish First Division club Partick Thistle on loan until the end of March. He made his debut from the start on 11 February against Livingston. Welsh's initial spell was disrupted by injury, and on 30 March 2012 after 5 appearances, his loan was extended until the end of the season.

After Welsh was released by Hibs in May 2012, he signed a two-year contract with Partick Thistle. Welsh played an integral part in guiding Thistle to the 2012–13 Scottish First Division championship, which led to the Jags being promoted to the top flight for the first time in nine years.

Welsh was handed the Thistle captaincy before the start of the 2013–14 Scottish Premiership season. On 14 August, Welsh extended his contract with Thistle until the end of the 2014/15 season. He struggled with a knee injury during the 2013–14 season. The Thistle captaincy was handed to Paul Gallacher whilst Welsh remained out. Welsh made his return for Thistle in November 2014, starting against St Mirren in Paisley. However, during the match, Welsh suffered a further knee injury, which kept him out for a further month.

He also struggled with further injuries during the 2014/15 season, as he made only three first team appearances. Welsh and Partick Thistle agreed to a short-term extension to his contract in June 2015, in an effort to prove his fitness. Welsh scored his first goal in the top flight converting thistle's first penalty in 69 games in a 2–1 defeat against Celtic.
Welsh scored his first goal of the 2016–17 season converting a first half penalty in a 1–1 draw with Ross county at Firhill. Welsh scored his second goal of the 2016–17 season, his first in open play since Partick Thistle's promotion in 2013, scoring the equaliser in a 1–1 draw away to Hamilton Accidemical. Welsh left Thistle in May 2017, after his contract with the club ended.

Falkirk
After almost eight months without a club, Welsh signed with struggling Scottish Championship side Falkirk on a short-term deal. Welsh left Falkirk at the end of the 2017–18 season.

Inverness Caledonian Thistle 
Soon after leaving Falkirk, Welsh joined fellow Championship side Inverness Caledonian Thistle. Welsh scored his first goal for the club in August 2018, as he scored a penalty against Alloa Athletic F.C.

Career statistics

References

1990 births
Living people
Footballers from Edinburgh
Scottish footballers
Association football midfielders
Hibernian F.C. players
Stenhousemuir F.C. players
Stirling Albion F.C. players
Partick Thistle F.C. players
Falkirk F.C. players
Scottish Football League players
Scottish Professional Football League players
Inverness Caledonian Thistle F.C. players